Hippodrome de Vincennes is a horse racing track located in Paris, France. It has a capacity of 80,000. It was created in 1863 and rebuilt in 1879, after being destroyed in the Franco-Prussian War.

It has been used for concerts as well, hosting:
Pink Floyd - September 12, 1970 
Grateful Dead - Oct 17, 1981
Queen - June 14, 1986, with Belouis Some, Level 42 and Marillion
Genesis - June 3, 1987, with Paul Young
U2 - July 4–5, 1987 and June 26, 1993, with Belly and The Velvet Underground. The first date, was filmed and recorded for the live home video and album, Live from Paris.
Bruce Springsteen & The E Street Band - June 19, 1988
Whitesnake - September 1, 1990
AC/DC - September 21, 1991
Guns N' Roses - June 6, 1992
Elton John - June 18, 1992
Michael Jackson - September 13, 1992 (85,000 fans attended the show)
Metallica - June 13, 1993, with The Cult and Suicidal Tendencies

Horse racing venues in France
Sports venues in Paris
Sports venues completed in 1863